The Pyatnitskoye Сemetery is one of the graveyards in the Russian town Kaluga.  It is among the oldest and largest resting places in the city. On the territory of the cemetery is the Memorial to the Heroes of the Great Patriotic War.

History and name
Park-necropolis Pyatnitskoye Сemetery in   Kaluga was discovered relatively recently in 1780. Earlier in this place there was a large number of parish cemeteries, one can say at each of the 46 temples of Kaluga. The new cemetery was located on the earthen rampart, which ran through today's streets of Barricade and Labor, located in the northern part of the city. The cemetery is fenced with a brick fence, its total area is 23 hectares. In the distant 1785 on the territory of the cemetery towered the Peter and Paul Temple. Years passed. The cemetery dates back several centuries, during this time a very large number of inhabitants of the city were buried on its territory. Nearby there is (and adjoins) one more cemetery Military cemetery. It buried more than four thousand people who died in the battles in the fields of the Great Patriotic War. The cemetery has preserved ancient monuments, made of marble, granite, sandstone. These monuments are of great architectural and historical value.

Location and size
Located at: Kaluga, Truda Street 1a, rectangular, is limited to: Truda Street, Truda Lane, Kirpichnaya Street and Television Street.

Notable people buried at the Pyatnitskoye Cemetery 
 ,  Hero of Socialist Labour
 , murdered Russian journalist, editor-in-chief of the newspaper Kaluga Vechernyaya
 ,  Soviet theater and cinema actress, People's Artist of the RSFSR
 ,  Soviet military commander, participant in the Civil and Great Patriotic War
 Prince Yevgeny Obolensky,  Russian officer from  Obolensky's clan, one of the most active participants in the Decembrist revolt
 ,  Soviet theater director, teacher, writer, chief director of Kaluga Regional Drama Theatre
 ,  Konstantin Tsiolkovsky's wife (grave is lost)
 ,  Russian and Soviet inventor-gunner, the creator of the commander's goniometer for firing from closed positions and the device for destroying wire barriers, Major General of Artillery of the Tsarist Army,  father of Alexander Chizhevsky
 ,    Nikita Khrushchev's first school teacher
 ,   Soviet musician, guitarist of the band Sinyaya Ptitsa
 ,   composer, musician, military conductor (grave is lost)
 ,  Soviet theater  actress, People's Artist of the RSFSR
 Aleksandra Troitskaya, Soviet microbiologist-leprologist
 , Major General of the Soviet Army, participant of the Great Patriotic War, Hero of the Soviet Union (1945)
 , Russian businessman of German origin, brewer

References

External links
 Кладбище на Яндекс-Картах
 Виртуальный тур: Пятницкое кладбище (Калуга)
 Прогулка по кладбищу: какие знаменитости покоятся в Калуге

1780 establishments in the Russian Empire
Cemeteries in Russia